Minnevali Galiyev (7 May 1930 – 28 December 2016) was a Russian cross-country skier. He competed in the men's 15 kilometre event at the 1956 Winter Olympics.

References

External links
 

1930 births
2016 deaths
Russian male cross-country skiers
Olympic cross-country skiers of the Soviet Union
Cross-country skiers at the 1956 Winter Olympics
People from Tatarstan
Sportspeople from Tatarstan